Jonathan Theophilus Okoronkwo (born 13 September 2003) is a Nigerian professional footballer who plays for Russian club FC Krasnodar.

Club career
Okoronkwo joined FC Krasnodar-2 in Russia on loan from Bulgarian club Botev Plovdiv on 22 February 2022. He made his debut in the Russian Football National League for Krasnodar-2 on 8 March 2022 in a game against FC Baltika Kaliningrad.

In April 2022, Okoronkwo was promoted to the main squad of FC Krasnodar and made his Russian Premier League debut on 3 April 2022 in a game against FC Dynamo Moscow.

On 14 June 2022, Okoronkwo transferred to Krasnodar on a permanent basis and signed a four-year contract with the club.

Career statistics

References

External links
 
 
 Profile by Russian Football National League

2003 births
People from Calabar
Living people
Nigerian footballers
Association football forwards
Botev Plovdiv players
FC Krasnodar-2 players
FC Krasnodar players
Russian First League players
Russian Premier League players
Nigerian expatriate footballers
Expatriate footballers in Bulgaria
Nigerian expatriate sportspeople in Bulgaria
Expatriate footballers in Russia
Nigerian expatriate sportspeople in Russia